The 1979 Wimbledon Championships was a tennis tournament that took place on the outdoor grass courts at the All England Lawn Tennis and Croquet Club in Wimbledon, London, United Kingdom. The tournament ran from 25 June until 7 July. It was the 93rd staging of the Wimbledon Championships, and the second Grand Slam tennis event of 1979.

This edition was the first to introduce the tiebreak with the scores at 6–6 instead of 8–8.

Prize money
The total prize money for 1979 championships was £277,066. The winner of the men's title earned £20,000 while the women's singles champion earned £18,000.

* per team

Champions

Seniors

Men's singles

 Björn Borg defeated  Roscoe Tanner, 6–7(4–7), 6–1, 3–6, 6–3, 6–4
It was Borg's 8th career Grand Slam title, and his 4th Wimbledon title.

Women's singles

 Martina Navratilova defeated  Chris Evert Lloyd, 6–4, 6–4
It was Navratilova's 2nd career Grand Slam title, and her 2nd (consecutive) Wimbledon title.

Men's doubles

 Peter Fleming /  John McEnroe defeated  Brian Gottfried /  Raúl Ramírez, 4–6, 6–4, 6–2, 6–2

Women's doubles

 Billie Jean King /  Martina Navratilova defeated  Betty Stöve /  Wendy Turnbull, 5–7, 6–3, 6–2
This was King's 20th Wimbledon title overall, surpassing Elizabeth Ryan's record of 19 overall titles. This record was subsequently matched by Navratilova in 2003.

Mixed doubles

 Bob Hewitt /  Greer Stevens defeated  Frew McMillan /  Betty Stöve, 7–5, 7–6(9–7)

Juniors

Boys' singles

 Ramesh Krishnan defeated  Dave Siegler, 6–0, 6–2

Girls' singles

 Mary-Lou Piatek defeated  Alycia Moulton, 6–1, 6–3

Singles seeds

Men's singles
  Björn Borg (champion)
  John McEnroe (fourth round, lost to Tim Gullikson)
  Jimmy Connors (semifinals, lost to Björn Borg)
  Vitas Gerulaitis (first round, lost to Pat DuPré)
  Roscoe Tanner (final, lost to Björn Borg)
  Guillermo Vilas (second round, lost to Tim Wilkison)
  Arthur Ashe (first round, lost to Chris Kachel)
  Víctor Pecci (third round, lost to Brad Drewett)
  Brian Gottfried (third round, lost to Brian Teacher)
  Wojciech Fibak (first round, lost to Bruce Manson)
  John Alexander (third round, lost to Gene Mayer)
  José Higueras (second round, lost to John Sadri)
  Manuel Orantes (second round, lost to Gilles Moretton)
  José Luis Clerc (fourth round, lost to Roscoe Tanner)
  Tim Gullikson (quarterfinals, lost to Roscoe Tanner)
  Corrado Barazzutti (first round, lost to Andrew Pattison)

Women's singles
  Martina Navratilova (champion)
  Chris Evert Lloyd (final, lost to Martina Navratilova)
  Evonne Goolagong Cawley (semifinals, lost to Chris Evert Lloyd)
  Tracy Austin (semifinals, lost to Martina Navratilova)
  Virginia Wade (quarterfinals, lost to Evonne Goolagong Cawley)
  Dianne Fromholtz (quarterfinals, lost to Martina Navratilova)
  Billie Jean King (quarterfinals, lost to Tracy Austin)
  Wendy Turnbull (quarterfinals, lost to Chris Evert Lloyd)
  Kerry Reid (fourth round, lost to Wendy Turnbull)
  Virginia Ruzici (fourth round, lost to Tracy Austin)
  Greer Stevens (fourth round, lost to Martina Navratilova)
  Sue Barker (first round, lost to Ivanna Madruga)
  Regina Maršíková (third round, lost to Hana Mandlíková)
  Kathy Jordan (fourth round, lost to Evonne Goolagong Cawley)
  Betty Stöve (fourth round, lost to Dianne Fromholtz)
  Pam Shriver (second round, withdrew)

References

External links
 Official Wimbledon Championships website

 
Wimbledon Championships
Wimbledon Championships
Wimbledon Championships
Wimbledon Championships